The Watoto Children's Choir is a group of African children choirs based in Kampala, Uganda, at Watoto Church and which tour internationally. Each is composed of about eighteen to twenty-two children from Uganda. Their tours raise money as well as awareness for the Watoto orphanages in Kampala. 

“Watoto” means "Children" in Swahili. The choir is made up of children who have lost one or both parents, often as a result of AIDS. Watoto operate six choirs which tour Asia, Australia, Europe and North and South America. The choirs travel with a team of adult chaperones who look after the children and also manage the day-to-day logistics of the tour on the road. The choir has toured Asia, Australia, Brazil, Canada and China.

Their ‘Concerts of Hope’ are a blend of African rhythms, contemporary gospel music, creative dance and story-telling. They have released several albums including “Mambo Number 5”, “Beautiful Africa” and “What Is Love”. Their latest album "Wherever You Will Go” features live music played throughout the concerts on most of the tours.

The Watoto Children's Choirs have performed with award-winning artists including Chris Tomlinson, Israel Houghton and Martin Smith. They have also been invited to the UK Houses of Parliament, the Canadian and Australian Parliaments as well as the White House.

As of May 2020, Watoto, the umbrella organisation, is under investigation by Uganda's Internal Security Organisation for alleged breaches of the country's child labour laws, taking children out of the country illegally and placing them at risk. Over 80 children reportedly remain stranded overseas in the US, Malaysia, New Zealand and Brazil after Uganda closed its borders on 23 March.  Watoto Church has also been criticised for its hardline stance on homosexuality.

References

External links

Choirs of children
Ugandan musical groups
Christianity in Uganda